Rafael Sánchez may refer to:

Rafael Sánchez Ferlosio, Spanish writer
Rafael Sánchez Guerra, president of Real Madrid from 1935 to 1939
Rafael Sánchez Mazas, founder and leader of Falange, a former Spanish political party
Rafael Sánchez Navarro, Spanish-Mexican actor
Rafael Molina Sánchez, Spanish bullfighter
Luis Rafael Sánchez, Puerto Rican playwright
Rafael Sánchez (wrestler), Dominican wrestler
Rafael Sánchez (footballer) (born 1998), Venezuelan footballer